The Ponderosa Fire was a destructive wildfire during the 2012 California wildfire season. While the fire only burned , it destroyed 133 structures, the most of any fire that year for the state. At the height of the fire on August 24, over 2,300 firefighters were involved in the suppression effort, which also included 254 fire engines, 46 bulldozers and 54 water tenders.

The fire
The Ponderosa Fire started at around 11:30 AM PDT, on August 18, 2012. The fire was ignited by a lightning strike west of the community of Manton.

References

2012 California wildfires
August 2012 events in the United States

Wildfires in Shasta County, California
Wildfires in Tehama County, California